

Kieran Dynes (born 18 December 1970) is an Irish auto racing driver. He last competed in the European Late Model Series. He has also raced in the NASCAR Busch Series (now Xfinity Series) and the ARCA Racing Series in the United States.

Career

American racing
Dynes along with IndyCar legend Dario Franchitti are the only UK drivers ever to compete in both the NASCAR Xfinity and ARCA series.

NASCAR
In 2000, Dynes made his debut in the Busch Series alongside 2010 Daytona 500 and 2010 Brickyard 400 champion Jamie McMurray. He replaced Mike Wallace in the #77 Lear UAW sponsored Ford which at the time was a very uncompetitive car and team. The race was held at Memphis Motorsports Park, in Memphis, Tennessee, and was won by Kevin Harvick. Jeff Green wrapped up the championship on the same day. Dynes started the event in 42nd place and retired early with engine problems.

ARCA
In 2001, in final practice at Lowe's Motor Speedway, Dynes was caught up in an accident which left him with back injuries.

European racing
In 2003 he competed in Touring Cars and the ASCAR stock car series, based in Rockingham, England.

On 10 October 2010 Dynes made a successful return to the race track and took the checkered flag and first place in a late model stock car race at Warneton speedway Belgium. 2011 saw Dynes competing in the European Late Model Series; he drove the #51 Deuce brand-sponsored Chevrolet for British team Revolution Racing. Dynes retired from racing in 2013 after suffering a serious leg injury at Venray Speedway in the Netherlands; he had 3 European late model victories and a total of 14 podium finishes.

Motorsports career results

NASCAR
(key) (Bold – Pole position awarded by qualifying time. Italics – Pole position earned by points standings or practice time. * – Most laps led.)

Busch Series

External links

1970 births
Racing drivers from Northern Ireland
NASCAR drivers
ARCA Menards Series drivers
People from Dungannon
Living people
ASCAR drivers